Gerry Murphy (born 22 July 1943, in Dublin, Ireland) was the Director of Football Development at Huddersfield Town between 1988 and 2009. He was the Academy Director between 1988 and 17 April 2007, and was caretaker manager of Huddersfield Town in three different spells.

Career
Murphy never played football above amateur level, but has the full complement of coaching qualifications to international level.

Huddersfield Town
Murphy worked at Huddersfield Town since 1988, where he joined as scout. He also filled the Academy chief role, was three times Caretaker Manager, and his final position was as Director of Football Development.

Award
Murphy won the Football League's Contribution to Football award on 5 March 2006 selected by listeners of BBC Radio Five Live's Sport on Five.

Huddersfield Town Academy
In February 2007, Huddersfield's 23-man first-team squad included 15 academy graduates. The most notable graduate was Jon Stead who was sold to Premier League side Blackburn Rovers for £1.25m in February 2004.

Management positions
Following Peter Jackson's contract termination on 6 March 2007, Murphy was put in temporary charge of Huddersfield Town's first team affairs, a role that lasted for six games until 11 April 2007.

Then on 17 April 2007, Murphy was appointed Director of Football Development. In addition to his position as Academy Director he has been handed control of the Club's scouting activities.

Following Andy Ritchie's contract termination on 1 April 2008, Murphy was put in temporary charge of Huddersfield Town's first team affairs for the second time. His second tenure ended on 3 May, when Stan Ternent took over for the new season.

Following Ternent's sacking, Murphy was put in charge for a third time. After losing 4–3 to Port Vale in the FA Cup, Town beat Leeds United at Elland Road for the first time in nearly 25 years. This was followed by a win at Brighton & Hove Albion, their first ever at the Withdean Stadium, a defeat against Leyton Orient and victories over Walsall and Southend United. Murphy was replaced by new manager Lee Clark on 15 December.

In Murphy's three terms in charge, he has led the team to victories over Town's West Yorkshire rivals, Bradford City (2–0 on 10 March 2007) and Leeds United (1–0 on 15 April 2008 and 2–1 on 15 November 2008).

Products of the academy include Andy Holdsworth, Michael Collins, Nathan and Tom Clarke, David Mirfin, Jon Worthington, Jon Stead and Andy Booth.

Managerial statistics

References

1943 births
Living people
Sportspeople from Dublin (city)
Republic of Ireland football managers
Huddersfield Town A.F.C. managers
Huddersfield Town A.F.C. non-playing staff